The following article outlines the discography of French rapper and songwriter Nessbeal, which includes five studio albums, one mixtape and six singles.

Albums

Studio albums

Mixtapes

Singles

As lead artist

As featured artist

References

External links
 
 
 

 
 
Hip hop discographies
Discographies of French artists